Mass action may refer to:
Law of mass action, in chemistry, a postulate of reactions
Mass action law (electronics), in semiconductor electronics, a relationship between intrinsic and doped carrier concentrations
Mass action (sociology), in sociology, a term for situations in which a large number of people behave simultaneously in similar ways individually and without coordination 
Mass Action Principle (neuroscience), in neuroscience, the belief that memory and learning are distributed and can't be isolated within any one area of the brain
Mass tort, or mass action, in law, which is when plaintiffs form a group to sue a defendant (for similar alleged harms)